is a former Japanese football player.

Club statistics

References

External links

j-league

1984 births
Living people
International Budo University alumni
Association football people from Chiba Prefecture
Japanese footballers
J2 League players
Japan Football League players
Tochigi SC players
Tochigi City FC players
Association football midfielders